Robert "Bobby" Thomson (born 21 March 1955) is a Scottish former professional footballer who played as a midfielder.

Glasgow-born Thomson began his League career with St Johnstone and would spend five years at the club before moving to Greenock Morton. He moved to England to play for Middlesbrough but returned to Scotland a year later to play for Hibernian. Thomson played 78 games for Hibs, but he was banned for six months after an incident with a linesman during a match against St Johnstone in 1983. He was a regular under the management of Pat Stanton, but fell out of favour when John Blackley became Hibs manager. Thomson briefly returned to Morton in 1985, on loan from Hibs.

Thomson joined Blackpool in August 1985, at a time when the club was about to embark on something of a revival under the management of Sam Ellis. "Thomson's aggression and experience will stiffen competition in the attack," said Ellis of the signing. A brief spell at Hartlepool United followed, before joining Hamilton Academical. Thomson then moved into non-League football with Southport.

Since retiring from football, Thomson has been employed as a day care worker. His daughter, Hollie, has played for Hibernian and Scotland.

References

External links

1955 births
Living people
Association football midfielders
Scottish footballers
St Johnstone F.C. players
Greenock Morton F.C. players
Middlesbrough F.C. players
Hibernian F.C. players
Blackpool F.C. players
Hartlepool United F.C. players
Hamilton Academical F.C. players
Scottish Football League players
English Football League players
Scottish Football League representative players